Jérémy Pouge (born 3 May 1980 in Tournon-sur-Rhône) is a French rower.

References

External links 
 

1980 births
Living people
French male rowers
Sportspeople from Ardèche
World Rowing Championships medalists for France